C J Segerstrom & Sons is a family business incorporated as a real estate company in Orange County (along with the Irvine Company and the O'Neill family), especially in the city of Costa Mesa. Swedish immigrant Carl Segerstrom began by buying a large lima bean farm in 1900. In 1967 construction began on their mall, South Coast Plaza. The enormous shopping center is one of the highest grossing in the US, with over 300 stores and around one and a half billion dollars in annual sales. The family also owns land rights to much of the commercial office space around the mall. The family's monetary donations provided for the construction of the Orange County Performing Arts Center, on land donated by the family/company. Besides the performing arts center the family/company donates to the Newport-Mesa school district. Though they have sold the property rights to the residential areas south of the 405 Freeway, they retain the mineral rights.

In September 2006, the Segerstroms opened a new concert hall, the Renée and Henry Segerstrom Concert Hall. The family has also recently opened a high school near South Coast Plaza, Segerstrom High, in the Santa Ana Unified School District. Plans are underway to construct a church across the street from the high school.

Related links
http://www.ocpac.org

http://www.southcoastplaza.com

Companies based in Orange County, California
Companies based in Costa Mesa, California
Philanthropists from California